Dancer in Nowhere is an album by Miho Hazama and her chamber orchestra m_unit, released in November 2018.

This album was nominated for Best Large Jazz Ensemble Album at the 62nd Annual Grammy Awards.

Track listing
All compositions by Miho Hazama except as indicated
"Today, Not Today" – 8:03
"The Cyclic Number" – 8:02
"RUN" – 7:06
"Somnambulant" – 9:44
"Il Paradiso Del Blues" – 8:56
"Magyar Dance" – 8:06
"Olympic Fanfare and Theme" (John Williams) – 6:08
"Dancer in Nowhere" – 8:38

Track listing adapted from Apple Music

Personnel

 Miho Hazama – conductor
 Jonathan Powell – trumpet, flugelhorn
 Adam Unsworth – French horn (track: 2)
  – tenor saxophone, clarinet (tracks: 1 to 3, 5 to 7)
 Ryoji Ihara – tenor saxophone, clarinet, flute (tracks: 1 to 3, 5 to 7)
 Steve Wilson – alto saxophone, soprano saxophone, flute (track: 2)
 Andrew Gutauskas – baritone saxophone, bass clarinet
 Lionel Loueke – guitar [Guest] (track: 4)
 Billy Test – piano
 James Shipp – vibraphone, guiro, shekere
 Jake Goldbas – drums (tracks: 1 to 7)
 Nate Wood – drums [Guest] (track: 8)
 Sam Anning – bass
 Atsuki Yoshida – viola
 Sita Chay – violin
 Tomoko Akaboshi – violin
 Meaghan Burke – cello
 Kavita Shah – voice (tracks: 4, 6)

References

External links

 

2018 albums
Miho Hazama albums
Sunnyside Records albums
Verve Records albums